The list of ship launches in 1761 includes a chronological list of some ships launched in 1761.


References

1761
Ship launches